Anne-Marie Mineur (born 14 May 1967) is a Dutch politician who was Member of the European Parliament (MEP) for the Netherlands between 2014 and 2019. She is a member of the Socialist Party, part of the European United Left–Nordic Green Left in the European Parliament. Previously Mineur was municipal councillor in De Bilt (2006–2012) and member of the States of Utrecht (2011–2014).

Career
Mineur was born on 14 May 1967 in Oss, where she would also receive her primary and secondary education. She graduated high school in 1986 and then started studying speech and language-technologies at Utrecht University. In 1989–1990 she went on exchange to the University of Essex and she graduated from Utrecht University in 1992. From 1993 to 1997 she went to Saarland University to study computational linguistics. Mineur was a researcher at the German Research Centre for Artificial Intelligence between 1996 and 1997. In 1998 she returned to Utrecht University to become a researcher until 2004, she would move on that year to the University of Groningen to become a researcher and lecturer.

Political career
Mineur joined the Socialist Party in 2003 and in 2006 she became member of the municipal council of De Bilt, where she would serve until 2012. By March 2011 she concurrently became member of the States of Utrecht, which she would stay until she became member of the European Parliament on 1 July 2014. In the States of Utrecht she was party leader.

European Parliament
Mineur occupied the third place on the Socialist Party list for the European Parliament elections of 2014, the party obtained two seats with Mineur elected on the basis of 52,000 preferential votes. Hereby she won the seat over Eric Smaling. In her campaign she criticized the transfer of competences over issues such as pensions and social rent to the European Union.

In the European Parliament she was member of the Committee on International Trade and member of the Delegation to the Cariforum — EU Parliamentary Committee. Her term in office ended on 2 July 2019.

Electoral history

References

1967 births
Living people
21st-century Dutch politicians
21st-century Dutch women politicians
21st-century women MEPs for the Netherlands
Members of the Provincial Council of Utrecht
MEPs for the Netherlands 2014–2019
Municipal councillors in Utrecht (province)
People from De Bilt
People from Oss
Saarland University alumni
Socialist Party (Netherlands) MEPs
Socialist Party (Netherlands) politicians
Academic staff of the University of Groningen
Utrecht University alumni
Academic staff of Utrecht University